In the mathematical fields of graph theory and combinatorial optimization, the bipartite dimension or biclique cover number of a graph G = (V, E) is the minimum number of bicliques (that is complete bipartite subgraphs), needed to cover all edges in E. A collection of bicliques covering all edges in G is called a biclique edge cover, or sometimes biclique cover. The bipartite dimension of G is often denoted by the symbol d(G).

Example
An example for a biclique edge cover is given in the following diagrams:

Bipartite dimension formulas for some graphs

The bipartite dimension of a 2n-vertex
crown graph equals , where

is the inverse function of the central binomial coefficient .

The bipartite dimension of the  lattice graph is
and is  otherwise .

 determine the bipartite dimension for some special graphs. For example, the path 
has  and the cycle  has .

Computing the bipartite dimension
The computational task of determining the bipartite dimension for a given graph G is an optimization problem. The decision problem for bipartite dimension can be phrased as:

INSTANCE: A graph  and a positive integer .
QUESTION: Does G admit a biclique edge cover containing at most  bicliques?

This problem appears as problem GT18 in Garey and Johnson's classical book on NP-completeness, and is a rather straightforward reformulation of
another decision problem on families of finite sets.

The set basis problem appears as problem SP7 in Garey and Johnson's book.
Here, for a family  of subsets of a finite set ,
The set basis problem is now given as follows:

QUESTION: Does there exist a set basis of size at most  for ?

The problem remains NP-hard even if we restrict our attention to bipartite graphs whose bipartite dimension is guaranteed to be at most , with n denoting the size of the given problem instance . On the positive side, the problem is solvable in polynomial time on bipartite domino-free graphs .

Regarding the existence of approximation algorithms,  proved that the problem cannot be approximated well (assuming P ≠ NP). Indeed, the bipartite dimension is NP-hard to approximate within  for every fixed , already for bipartite graphs .

In fact, for a given bipartite graph on n vertices, it can be decided in time  with  whether its bipartite dimension is at most k

Applications
The problem of determining the bipartite dimension of a graph appears in various contexts of computing. For instance, in computer systems, different users of a system can be allowed or disallowed accessing various resources. In a role-based access control system, a role provides access rights to a set of resources. A user can own multiple roles, and he has permission to access all resources granted by some of his roles. Also, a role can be owned by multiple users. The role mining problem is to find a minimum set of roles, such that for each user, his roles taken together grant access to all specified resources. The set of users together with the set of resources in the system naturally induces a bipartite graph, whose edges are permissions.

A similar scenario is known in computer security, more specifically in secure broadcasting. In that setup, several messages need to be sent each to a set of receivers, over an insecure channel. Each message has to be encrypted using some cryptographic key that is known only to the intended receivers. Each receiver may possess multiple encryption keys, and each key will be distributed to multiple receivers. The optimum key generation problem is to find a minimum set of encryption keys for ensuring secure transmission. As above, the problem can be modeled using a bipartite graph whose minimum biclique edge covers coincide with the solutions to the optimum key generation problem .

A different application lies in biology, where minimum biclique edge covers are used in mathematical models of human leukocyte antigen (HLA) serology .

See also
List of NP-complete problems
Intersection number (graph theory), the minimum number of cliques needed to cover the edges of a graph

References

.
.
.
.
.
.
.
.
.
.
.

.
.
.
.

External links
blog entry about bipartite dimension by David Eppstein

NP-complete problems
Graph invariants
Bipartite graphs
Covering problems